Zeana Muratovic, known simply as Zeana, (born 5 November 1992) is a Swedish singer. She participated in Idol 2016 which was broadcast on TV4, where she placed twelfth. Zeana participated in Melodifestivalen 2019 with the song "Mina bränder" along with Anis Don Demina. They took part in the first semifinal in Gothenburg on 2 February and placed fifth.

On 4 February 2019, the song "Mina bränder" entered the Spotify 200 chart at place 12.

Singles

References

External link

Swedish women singers
1992 births
People from Växjö
Idol (Swedish TV series) participants
Living people
Melodifestivalen contestants of 2019